The 11th Dallas-Fort Worth Film Critics Association Awards, given by the Dallas-Fort Worth Film Critics Association on December 19, 2005, honored the best in film for 2005. The organization, founded in 1990, includes 33 film critics for print, radio, television, and internet publications based in North Texas.

Top 10 films
 Brokeback Mountain
 Capote
 Good Night, and Good Luck.
 Crash (Academy Award for Best Picture)
 Cinderella Man
 Syriana
 Pride and Prejudice 
 A History of Violence
 King Kong
 The Three Burials of Melquiades Estrada

Winners

Best Actor: 
Philip Seymour Hoffman – Capote
Best Actress: 
Felicity Huffman – Transamerica
Best Animated Film: 
Wallace & Gromit: The Curse of the Were-Rabbit
Best Cinematography: 
Brokeback Mountain – Rodrigo Prieto
Best Director: 
Ang Lee – Brokeback Mountain
Best Documentary Film: 
Murderball
Best Film: 
Brokeback Mountain
Best Foreign Language Film: 
Paradise Now • France/Germany/Netherlands/Israel
Best Screenplay: 
Brokeback Mountain – Larry McMurtry and Diana Ossana
Best Supporting Actor: 
Matt Dillon – Crash
Best Supporting Actress:
Catherine Keener – Capote

References

External links
Dallas-Fort Worth Film Critics Association official website

2005
2005 film awards